The Canton of Thenon is a canton of the Dordogne département, in France. It was disbanded following the French canton reorganisation which came into effect in March 2015. It had 4,420 inhabitants (2012). The lowest point is 112 m in the commune of La Boissière-d'Ans, the highest point is in Azerat at 317 m, the average elevation is 209 m.  The most populated commune was Thenon with 1,280 inhabitants (2012).

Communes
The canton comprised the following communes:

Ajat
Azerat
Bars
La Boissière-d'Ans
Brouchaud
Fossemagne
Gabillou
Limeyrat
Montagnac-d'Auberoche
Sainte-Orse
Thenon

Population history

See also 
 Cantons of the Dordogne department

References

Thenon
2015 disestablishments in France
States and territories disestablished in 2015